Alejandro Korn is a city in the Buenos Aires Province, Argentina, located in the San Vicente Partido.

The settlement was founded on August 14, 1865, and renamed in honour of Alejandro Korn (1860 — 1935), an Argentine physician, philosopher, and reformist.

External links

 Ciudad de Alejandro Korn

San Vicente Partido
Populated places in Buenos Aires Province
Populated places established in 1865
Cities in Argentina
Argentina